Jeffrey Scott Vitter is a U.S. computer scientist and academic administrator.  Born in 1955 in New Orleans, Vitter has served in several senior higher education administration posts.  He is a former chancellor of the University of Mississippi (Ole Miss).  He assumed the chancellor position on January 1, 2016. His formal investiture to the chancellorship took place on November 10, 2016, at the University of Mississippi's Oxford Campus.

Education
Vitter was born and raised in New Orleans, Louisiana. He earned a Bachelor of Science in mathematics with highest honors from the University of Notre Dame in 1977, a Ph.D. in computer science from Stanford University under the supervision of Donald Knuth in 1980 and a master of business administration from Duke University in 2002.

Career
From 1980 to 1992, Vitter progressed through the faculty ranks in the Department of Computer Science at Brown University in Providence, Rhode Island. He was awarded tenure in 1985 at the age of 29.

At Duke University in Durham, North Carolina from 1993 to 2002, Vitter held a distinguished professorship as the Gilbert, Louis, and Edward Lehrman Professor.  He chaired the Department of Computer Science for eight and a half years, increased external research funding to 250%, and
led the department to a top-20 national ranking.

From 2002 to 2008, Vitter was the Frederick Hovde Dean of the College of Science at Purdue University in West Lafayette, Indiana, where he led the development of two strategic plans, establishing a dual focus of excellence in core departments and in multidisciplinary collaborations. He oversaw net growth by roughly 60 faculty members and launched the collaborative design of an innovative outcomes-based college curriculum.

Vitter served at Texas A&M University in College Station, Texas as provost and executive vice president for academics from 2008 to 2009, leading the 48,000-student university in the development of the institution's academic master plan and launching initiatives advancing faculty start-up allocations, multidisciplinary priorities and diversity. He also oversaw A&M's campus in Doha, Qatar.

From 2010 to 2015, Vitter was provost and executive vice chancellor and Roy A. Roberts Distinguished Professor at the University of Kansas in Lawrence, Kansas. As provost, Vitter was the chief academic and operations officer for the Lawrence and Edwards campuses. He co-chaired the development of the KU strategic plan Bold Aspirations and oversaw the creation of the first-ever university-wide KU Core curriculum, expansion of the Schools of Engineering and Business, boosting multidisciplinary research and funding around four strategic initiatives, major growth of technology commercialization and corporate partnerships, and administrative reorganization and efficiency.

Vitter spent sabbatical leaves at the Mathematical Sciences Research Institute in Berkeley, CA; INRIA in Rocquencourt, France; Ecole Normale Supérieure in Paris; Bell Laboratories in Murray Hill, New Jersey; Aarhus University in Aarhus, Denmark, and INRIA in Sophia Antipolis, France.

On October 29, 2015, Vitter was unanimously named as the 17th chancellor of the University of Mississippi by the Mississippi Board of Trustees of State Institutions of Higher Learning (IHL). He began duties as chancellor and Distinguished Professor of Computer & Information Science on January 1, 2016.

He introduced a strategic plan named Flagship Forward, with initiatives including a $1 billion building program, multidisciplinary research networks of faculty called Flagship Constellations, annual Technology Summits, major community partnerships through the M Partner program, establishment of the state's first Department of Biomedical Engineering, and extended capacity and reach of the University of Mississippi Medical Center.  The university began to look at Confederate symbols on campus and established an Office of Diversity and Community Engagement.  He unified fundraising across the campuses and led the university to its strongest three-year period of fundraising.  In December 2018, the university's status as a Carnegie R1 research university, initially attained in January 2016, was reaffirmed.

In November 2018, Vitter announced that he would step down as chancellor to become a regular faculty member on January 4, 2019.  Since July 2020 he is Distinguished Professor Emeritus and spends his time on consulting, working with a startup, and serving as adjunct professor at Tulane University.

Academic interests
Vitter is a computer scientist with over 350 books, journals, and conference publications, primarily on the design and mathematical analysis of algorithms dealing with big data and data science. His Google Scholar h-index is in the 70s, and he is an ISI highly cited researcher. He helped establish the field of I/O algorithms (a.k.a. "external memory algorithms") as a rigorous area of active investigation.  He has made fundamental contributions in databases; compressed data structures and indexing; data compression, including adaptive Huffman coding, arithmetic coding, image compression, and video compression; hashing and search data structures; randomized algorithms; sampling and random variate generation; prediction and machine learning; and average-case complexity.  He also does genealogy research on the Vitter.org website.

Personal
Vitter and his wife Sharon Weaver Vitter have three children: Jillian, J. Scott Jr. and Audrey.  He is a brother of former U.S. Senator David Vitter of Louisiana.  He and Sharon established the Vitter-Weaver family genealogy site at Vitter.org.

References

External links 
 Professional website: csci.cs.olemiss.edu/faculty/vitter/

1955 births
Living people
American computer scientists
People from New Orleans
University of Notre Dame alumni
Stanford University School of Engineering alumni
Fuqua School of Business alumni
Brown University faculty
Duke University faculty
Purdue University faculty
Texas A&M University faculty
University of Kansas faculty
Chancellors of the University of Mississippi
Fellows of the Association for Computing Machinery
Fellow Members of the IEEE
Fellows of the American Association for the Advancement of Science